The Philippine House Committee on Games and Amusements, or House Games and Amusements Committee is a standing committee of the Philippine House of Representatives.

Jurisdiction 
As prescribed by House Rules, the committee's jurisdiction is on all forms and places of gambling.

Members, 18th Congress

Historical members

18th Congress

Member for the Majority 
 Francisco Datol Jr. (SENIOR CITIZENS)

See also
 House of Representatives of the Philippines
 List of Philippine House of Representatives committees
 Philippine Amusement and Gaming Corporation

Notes

References

External links 
House of Representatives of the Philippines

Games and Amusements
Gambling in the Philippines